The International Journal of Innovation Management is the official journal of the International Society of Professional Innovation Management. The journal, founded in 1997, is published by Imperial College Press. It is peer-reviewed, and offers insight on handling various aspects of innovation, from research to new product development, from a management perspective.

Abstracting and indexing 

The journal is abstracted and indexed in the International Bibliography of the Social Sciences and Inspec.

Publications established in 1997
Business and management journals
World Scientific academic journals
English-language journals